Brian C. Moyer, Ph.D., is the Director of the U.S. National Center for Health Statistics.

As Director, Dr. Moyer provides executive leadership and strategic direction for the Center's statistical programs and policies. He serves as senior advisor to the Centers for Disease Control and Prevention and to the Secretary of the U.S. Department of Health and Human Services; he also serves as the Statistical Official for the Department.

Prior to joining NCHS, Dr. Moyer spent more than 25 years with the U.S. Department of Commerce. He served as Director of the Bureau of Economic Analysis (BEA), where he led modernization efforts to improve official economic statistics, including the measures of gross domestic product (GDP).

Dr. Moyer received a bachelor's and master's degrees in economics from the University of Maryland and a Ph.D. in economics in 2002 from American University.

References 

American civil servants
American economists
Living people
American University alumni
University System of Maryland alumni
Place of birth missing (living people)
Year of birth missing (living people)
United States Department of Commerce officials
Centers for Disease Control and Prevention
Trump administration personnel